Lirim Qamili (born 4 June 1998) is a Danish professional footballer who plays as a winger for Hvidovre.

Club career
In 2020, Qamili joined Danish Superliga club AC Horsens.

On 24 December 2022, Qamili returned to his former club Hvidovre.

References

Danish men's footballers
Albanian footballers
1998 births
Living people
Danish Superliga players
Danish 1st Division players
AC Horsens players
Boldklubben Frem players
Hvidovre IF players
Association football midfielders
Association football wingers
Association football forwards
Albania under-21 international footballers
People from Glostrup Municipality
Sportspeople from the Capital Region of Denmark